Knock Knock Live  is an American reality television series starring Ryan Seacrest that debuted on Fox as an entry in the 2015–16 television season. It premiered on Tuesday, July 21, 2015 live at 9pm ET, tape delayed at 9pm PT.

In the show, Seacrest and guest celebrities would visit the homes of ordinary people who have done something special and give them a prize such as cash or a new car. Some would meet their celebrity crushes, or a random game would take place in their front yard or on their street. Seacrest said: "We've tailored all of our responses to hopefully put a smile on people's faces and change their life a little bit. The fun thing about it, for me, is that this is a live show, so we don't have an idea of what's gonna happen."

On July 30, 2015, Fox canceled the show after two episodes due to low ratings.

Details
The premise of the show was that Seacrest and a fellow celebrity guest would knock on a random person's door and make their day by distributing prizes.   Ariana Grande, Justin Bieber, Lea Michele, Meghan Trainor, Rob Gronkowski, Robin Thicke, Rita Ora, Martha Stewart, Bubba Watson, David Beckham, Demi Lovato, Mike Holmes, Adrienne Bailon, Florida Georgia Line, Ross Mathews and Common were scheduled to be on the show's first season.

Episodes

References

External links
 
 

2010s American reality television series
2015 American television series debuts
2015 American television series endings
English-language television shows
Fox Broadcasting Company original programming
Television series by 20th Century Fox Television